Judge is an unincorporated community in Olmsted County, in the U.S. state of Minnesota.

History
A post office was established at Judge in 1897, and remained in operation until 1902. The community was named for Edward Judge, the original owner of the town site.

References

Unincorporated communities in Olmsted County, Minnesota
Unincorporated communities in Minnesota